The ARIA Streaming Chart is a chart that ranks the best-performing Streaming tracks singles of Australia. It is published by Australian Recording Industry Association (ARIA), an organisation who collect music data for the weekly ARIA Charts.

Chart history

Number-one artists

See also

2013 in music
List of number-one singles of 2013 (Australia)

References

Australia Streaming
Streaming 2013
Number-one Streaming Songs